Jeete Hain Shaan Se (trans: We Live With Honor) is a 1987 Bollywood action film directed by Kanwal Sharma, starring Mithun Chakraborty, Sanjay Dutt, and Govinda.

Plot
Johnny (Mithun Chakraborty), Govinda (Sanjay Dutt), and Iqbal (Govinda) are close friends who live in a small community in Bombay. They team up to help each other and other people in need in the community, which gets them on the wrong side of the gangster who goes by the pseudonym DK.  Tragedy strikes Govinda when his mother dies. During the funeral, Govinda is reunited with his father, lawyer Verma, who had been missing for several years. Soon after, a police inspector introduces Johnny to his biological mother, Mary.

The three friends rejoice over this good fortune. Then Johnny finds out that Verma was behind the atrocities that were inflicted upon his mother years ago, and goes to confront him, only to come up against an enraged Govinda, who cannot believe his father is capable of committing any atrocities against anyone. It is now up to Iqbal to find a solution to end the enmity between Govinda and Johnny, before DK takes advantage of this situation.

Cast
Mithun Chakraborty as Johnny/ Mithun Chakraborty (double role as guest appearance in song)
Sanjay Dutt as Govinda 
Govinda as Iqbal Ali 
Mandakini as Julie 
Vijeta Pandit as Kiran  
Danny Denzongpa as Balwant 
Gufi Paintal as Drunk 
Narendra Nath   
Tiwari   
Monty Nath as Dawood  
Sudhir as Babu 
Rajeev   
Satyendra Kapoor as Advocate Verma  
Ashalata as Geeta Verma 
Gita Siddharth as Mary 
C. S. Dubey   
Yunus Parvez as the Defence Council 
Viju Khote as drunk man
Mushtaq Merchant   
Raj Tilak
Krishnakant as Rahim Bhai 
Manik Irani as Gullu  
Gur Bachchan Singh as Goga  
Pramod A. Dubey

Songs
All songs were written by Indeevar, except "Salaam Seth Salaam Seth" which was penned by Shaily Shailendra.

"Julie Julie Johnny Ka Dil Tumpe Aaya" - Anu Malik, Kavita Krishnamurthy
"Govinda Govinda" - Shabbir Kumar
"Rab Roothe Roothe" - Anuradha Paudwal, Shabbir Kumar, Anu Malik
"Salaam Seth Salaam Seth" - Anu Malik
"Allah Hoo" - Mohammed Aziz
"Jeete Hain Shaan Se" - Amit Kumar, Anuradha Paudwal, Kavita Krishnamurthy, Shabbir Kumar, Shailendra Singh
"Julie Julie Johny Ka Dil Tumpe Aaya" Unreleased Song - Kumar Sanu, Kavita Krishnamurthy

External links 
 

1980s Hindi-language films
Films scored by Anu Malik
1988 films